Heterachthes gratiosus is a species of beetle in the family Cerambycidae. It was described by Martins in 1970.

References

Heterachthes
Beetles described in 1970